We is an upcoming Russian dystopian film directed by Hamlet Dulyan, a screen adaptation of the dystopia of the same name by Yevgeny Zamyatin.

Plot 
The Great War is over. As a result, most of the population perished. The survivors live in an impeccable, authoritarian One State. Each has its own serial number and uniform. For the D-503 engineer, who builds a super-powerful spacecraft, such a life is ideal. And suddenly he meets a woman, I-330, who radically changed his ideas about himself and awakened uncontrollable feelings.

Cast

Production 
This is the first Russian film adaptation of Zamyatin's novel. Filming has been completed, but due to the pandemic, work on the visual effects of the film has been temporarily suspended.

References

External links 
 

2023 films
2020s Russian-language films
2020s dystopian films
2020s science fiction drama films
Russian science fiction drama films
Russian dystopian films
Upcoming Russian-language films